Canadian provincial electoral districts have boundaries that are non-coterminous with those of the federal electoral districts, except for districts in the province of Ontario, where districts outside Northern Ontario are coterminous.

Otherwise, provincial electoral districts tend instead to be smaller, ranging from just over half the size of each federal district (Quebec) to a seventh (PEI).

Like their federal counterparts, Canadian provincial electoral districts are commonly called ridings.

Lists of provincial electoral districts
List of Alberta provincial electoral districts
List of British Columbia provincial electoral districts
List of Manitoba provincial electoral districts
List of New Brunswick provincial electoral districts
List of Newfoundland and Labrador provincial electoral districts
List of Nova Scotia provincial electoral districts
List of Ontario provincial electoral districts
List of Prince Edward Island provincial electoral districts
List of Quebec provincial electoral districts
List of Saskatchewan provincial electoral districts

Lists of territorial electoral districts
List of Yukon territorial electoral districts
List of Northwest Territories territorial electoral districts
List of Nunavut territorial electoral districts

Canadian electoral districts
 Provincial